The 1946–47 season was Aberdeen's 35th season in the top flight of Scottish football and their 36th season competed in the Scottish League Division One, Scottish League Cup, and the Scottish Cup.

Results

Division A

Final standings

Scottish League Cup

Group Section D

Section D final table

Knockout stage

Scottish Cup

References

AFC Heritage Trust

Aberdeen F.C. seasons
Aber